Maurycy Stefanowicz (born 1976), is a Polish musician and guitarist. Stefanowicz has played with such bands as Vader, Dies Irae, Christ Agony, UnSun. He is sponsored by Washburn Guitars.

Discography

References

Polish heavy metal guitarists
Living people
1976 births
Death metal musicians
Polish heavy metal singers
English-language singers from Poland
20th-century Polish  male singers
21st-century Polish male singers
21st-century Polish singers
21st-century guitarists
Polish male guitarists